Phoenix is a French band composed of 4 members named Thomas Mars (lead vocals), Deck d'Arcy (bass/ keyboards/ backing vocals), Christian Mazzalai (guitar/ keyboards/ backing vocals) and Laurent Brancowitz (guitar/ backing vocals). They have won 2 awards from 9 nominations.

American Music Awards 
The American Music Awards (AMAs) is an annual music awards show created by Dick Clark in 1973.

!
|-
| rowspan="1" | 2010
| rowspan="1" | Phoenix
| rowspan="1" | Favorite Alternative Artist
|
| style="text-align:center;"|
|-
|}

Grammy Awards
The Grammy Awards are awarded annually by the National Academy of Recording Arts and Sciences of the United States.

!
|-
|rowspan="1"|2010
|Wolfgang Amadeus Phoenix
|Best Alternative Music Album
|
| style="text-align:center;"|
|-
|}

International Dance Music Awards
The International Dance Music Awards, established in 1985, are an annual awards show honoring dance and electronic artists. It is a part of the Winter Music Conference, a weeklong electronic music event held annually.

!
|-
|rowspan="2"| 2010
|rowspan="1"| "1901"
| Best Alternative/Rock Dance Track
| 
| rowspan="2" style="text-align:center;"|
|-
|rowspan="2"| Phoenix
|Best Break-Through Artist (Group)
| 
|-
|rowspan="1"| 2011
|Best Artist (Group)
|
| style="text-align:center;"|
|-
|}

MTV Europe Music Awards
The MTV Europe Music Awards was established in 1994 by MTV Europe to award the music videos from European and international artists.

!
|-
|2000
|rowspan="2"| Phoenix
|rowspan="2"|Best French Act
|
| style="text-align:center;"|
|-
|2010
|
| style="text-align:center;"|
|-
|}

NME Awards 
The NME Awards are awarded annually by the UK music magazine NME. 

!scope="col"|
|-
| 2014
| Phoenix
| Best International Band
| 
| style="text-align:center;"|
|-
|}

Victoires de la Musique 
The Victoires de la Musique is an annual French award ceremony by the French Ministry of Culture to recognize outstanding achievement in the music industry that recognizes the best musical artists of the year.
!scope="col"|
|-
| 2014
| Bankrupt!
| Rock Album of the Year
| 
| style="text-align:center;"|
|-
|}

References 

Phoenix
Phoenix